The British Royal Navy captured at least four French privateers named Adolphe during the period of the French Revolutionary and Napoleonic Wars:

French Revolutionary Wars
King George led the chase with Nautilus and Seagull joining in before Nautilus succeeded in capturing Adolphe. Adolphe was pierced for 12 guns but had thrown some overboard during the chase. When the British captured her, Adolphe had five carriage guns, eight swivels, and a crew of 35. She was new, nine days out of Boulogne on her first cruise and had not taken any prizes.
1798:  captured Adolphe, of six guns and 42 men, around 20 November 1798 near Tangier Bay.
Napoleonic Wars
1807:On 26 January 1807, the armed defense ship  captured the French privateer lugger . 
1807:On 4 December 1807  captured the privateer lugger .

There were other privateers by that name as well:
In 1799–1800, during the Quasi-War, Adolphe, César Cronstag, master, captured four American vessels. 
Lloyd's List reported on 14 June 1811 that French privateer Adolphe had captured George and Mary, but that  had recaptured George and Mary, which had been sailing from the West Indies and which arrived in Plymouth on 11 June.

Citations

References
 
 

Ship names
Privateer ships of France